Nenjiang may refer to:

 Nen River, major tributary of the Songhua River in Heilongjiang, China
 Nenjiang City, city in Heilongjiang
 Nenjiang Town, seat of Nenjiang City
 Nenjiang Prefecture, former prefecture
 Nenjiang Province, former province in Northeast China